Calixthe Beyala  (born 1961) is a Cameroonian-French writer who writes in French.

Biography

A Cameroonian author and member of the Eton people, Calixthe Beyala was born in Sa'a to Cameroonian parents.
 
Her aunt and grandmother were particularly strong influences on her development, and she grew up listening to her grandmother's stories. Stories from which she drew inspiration and used to motivate her to work hard toward the creation of a meaningful career.

Beyala was educated at the École Principale du Camp Mboppi in Douala and went on to study at the Lycée des Rapides à Bangui and the Lycée Polyvalent de Douala. 
She eventually won a scholarship to study in Paris at the age of seventeen, where she through a strong academic performance obtained a baccalaureate. 

After a few years in Spain she published her first book, C'est le soleil qui m'a brûlée, at the age of 23 and eventually chose to become a full-time writer.

Awards
 1998 - Le Prix comité français de l'UNESCO
 1996 – Grand Prix du Roman de l'Académie Française
 1994 – Prix François Mauriac de l’Académie française
 1994 – Prix tropique
 1993 – Grand prix littéraire de l’Afrique noire

Works
 C'est le soleil qui m'a brûlée 1987 Oxford: Heinemann;  Librio, 1997, 
 Tu t'appelleras Tanga, Stock, 1988, 
 Seul le Diable le savait, Pré aux Clercs, 1990, 
 La négresse rousse (1991);   Éd. J'ai lu, 1997, 
 Le petit prince de Belleville, A. Michel, 1992, 
 Maman a un amant, Editions J'ai lu, 1993, —Grand Prize of Literature of Black Africa
 Asséze l'Africaine, A. Michel, 1994,  -- François Mauriac Prize of the Académie française
 Lettre d'une africaine à ses sœurs occidentales, Spengler, 1995
 Les Honneurs perdus, A. Michel, 1996,  -- Grand Prix du roman de l'Académie française
 La petite fille du réverbère, Albin Michel, 1998, —Grand Prize of Unicef
 Amours sauvages Albin Michel, 1999, ;  J'ai lu, 2000, 
 Lettre d'une Afro-française à ses compatriotes, Mango, 2000, 
 Comment cuisiner son mari à l'africaine, Albin Michel, 2000, 
 Les arbres en parlent encore…, Librairie générale française, 2004, 
 Femme nue, femme noire, Albin Michel, 2003, 
 La plantation, Albin Michel, 2005, 
 L'homme qui m'offrait le ciel: roman, Albin Michel, 2007, 
 Le Roman de Pauline:roman, Paris, Albin Michel, 2009
 Les Lions indomptables, Paris, Albin Michel, 2010
 Le Christ selon l'Afrique,roman, Paris, Albin Michel, 2014

English translations
Loukoum: the 'little prince' of Belleville, Translator Marjolijn De Jager, Heinemann, 1995, 
The sun hath looked upon me, Translator Marjolijn De Jager, Heinemann, 1996, 
Your name shall be Tanga, Translator Marjolijn De Jager, Heinemann, 1996, 
How to Cook Your Husband the African Way, Translator David Cohen, Psychology News Press, 2016,

References

External links
"Calixthe Beyala", The Literary Encyclopedia
Article, "Neither Here nor There: Calixthe Beyala's Collapsing Homes" by Ayo Abiétou Coly, from Research in African Literatures (33: 2)
"Calixthe Beyala : writing in the margins", Africultures, Boniface Mongo-Mboussa
"Calixthe Beyala, or the Literary Success of a Cameroonian Woman Living in Paris", Jean-Marie Volet, World Literature Today, Vol. 67, No. 2 (Spring, 1993), pp. 309–314
Charles Salé, Calixthe Beyala: analyse sémiotique de Tu t'appelleras Tanga, Harmattan, 2005,

Further reading
Hitchcott, Nicki, Calixthe Beyala: Performances of Migration, Liverpool University Press, December 2006, 

Cameroonian novelists
Cameroonian women
Cameroonian women writers
1961 births
Living people
People from Douala
Grand Prix du roman de l'Académie française winners
French women novelists
20th-century French novelists
20th-century French women writers
21st-century French novelists
21st-century French women writers
Cameroonian emigrants to France
20th-century Cameroonian writers
21st-century Cameroonian writers
20th-century Cameroonian women writers
21st-century Cameroonian women writers